Joseph Angelo Macaluso (April 6, 1931 -  March 22, 2011) was a Canadian Member of Parliament for the riding of Hamilton West, and a member of the Liberal Party of Canada.

He was elected in the 1963 Canadian federal election, serving until 1968 when he did not run again.

In the 1984 federal election he sought to make a return to Parliament for Lincoln, Ontario but was defeated.

Macaluso is a barrister/solicitor and served as an alderman for Hamilton, Ontario City Council from 1960 to 1963.

References
 

1931 births
2011 deaths
Hamilton, Ontario city councillors
Liberal Party of Canada MPs
Members of the House of Commons of Canada from Ontario
20th-century Canadian politicians